Buckeye Island is a small island of the U.S. state of Ohio, in Lake Erie. It is located just off shore of the northeast tip of South Bass Island, in Put-in-Bay Township, Ottawa County. It was seasonally populated early in the 20th century. The island was noted for the Willow trees found there. It is privately owned, and has been by the same family since 1916.

It is sometimes labeled as "Buckeye Point".

References

Lake Erie Islands by Michael Gora

Islands of Ottawa County, Ohio
Islands of Lake Erie in Ohio
Private islands of Ohio
Private islands of the Great Lakes